Wierzbięcin may refer to the following places:
Wierzbięcin, Lubusz Voivodeship (west Poland)
Wierzbięcin, Pomeranian Voivodeship (north Poland)
Wierzbięcin, West Pomeranian Voivodeship (north-west Poland)